24 de Diciembre is a Panama Metro station on Line 2. It was opened on 25 April 2019 as part of the inaugural section of Line 2 between San Miguelito and Nuevo Tocumen. This is an elevated station built above the Pan-American Highway. The station is located between Altos de Tocumen and Nuevo Tocumen.

References

Panama Metro stations
2019 establishments in Panama
Railway stations opened in 2019